The Syracuse City Hall is the city hall of Syracuse, New York.

Unusually for civic buildings in the United States, it was constructed from 1889 to 1893 in the Romanesque Revival architectural style. The bid accepted for the construction was for $238,750.00 from Hughes Brothers of Syracuse.

Gallery

See also 
 National Register of Historic Places listings in Syracuse, New York

References

External links

Blog.syracuse.com

Buildings and structures in Syracuse, New York
National Register of Historic Places in Syracuse, New York
City and town halls on the National Register of Historic Places in New York (state)
Government buildings completed in 1893
Romanesque Revival architecture in New York (state)
Skyscrapers in Syracuse, New York
Skyscraper office buildings in New York (state)